Eurhinodelphis ("well-nosed dolphin") is an extinct genus of Miocene cetacean. Its fossils have been found in Belgium, France, and Maryland.

Species

Currently-valid species are:
 E. cocheuteuxi 
 E. longirostris

Former species include:
 E. bossi, now a species of Xiphiacetus.

Description

In most respects, it would have looked like a modern dolphin or porpoise, but its upper jaw was elongated into a sharp tip similar to that of a swordfish. Most likely, Eurhinodelphis used it in a similar manner to swordfish, hitting or stabbing prey. It also had long, sharp teeth.

Compared with earlier fossil species, Eurhinodelphis had complex ears, suggesting that it already hunted by echolocation like modern whales. Its brain was also asymmetrical, a trait found in modern dolphins, and possibly associated with the complexities of navigating its environment.

History
Eurhinodelphis was first described by B. Du Bus in a paper read before the Royal Academy of Sciences of Belgium on 17 December 1867. O. Abel studied and illustrated the European species in a series of articles published in 1901, 1902 and 1905; subsequently, fossil skulls found in the Calvert Formation in Maryland and Virginia could be attributed to this genus.

References

External links
Eurhinodelphis Information - Including an Excavation: Fossilguy.com

Miocene mammals of North America
Prehistoric toothed whales
Miocene cetaceans
Prehistoric cetacean genera
Fossil taxa described in 1867
Miocene mammals of Europe